Jadipai Waterfall located at Ruma Upazila of Bandarban District is one of the widest water falls in Bangladesh. It is one of the most attractive tourist spots of Bangladesh. The flow of Jadipai fall becomes robust during the rainy season.

Location 
It is located in Ruma Upazila of Bandarban District. It is about 2 hour walking distance from Keokaradong peak.

Tourists Attraction
The way is thoroughly zigzag and some places slender. At along these lines traveler will pass the "Passing Para" and "Jadi Para". Last 30 minute of this journey is truly risky. After all when the travelers reaches to Jadipai Falls he will overlook all the anguish on the grounds that the natural magnificence of Jadipai waterfall is truly stunning and surprising.

References

External links 

Waterfalls of Bangladesh
Bandarban District
Chittagong Division